Hypersensitive is the second album by American rock band Ghost Machine. It was released on November 21, 2006 via Corporate Punishment Records.

The original track listing of the album, displayed on sites like Amazon and AllMusic, was identical to that of their self-titled debut album Ghost Machine (2005). However, it actually features ten new tracks and the older tracks have been slightly reworked.

Track listing
 "The End" – 2:12
 "Sheltered" – 4:00
 "Headstone" – 3:50
 "D.U.A." – 2:08
 "God Forbid"  – 3:43
 "What You Made Me (Ugli)" – 3:21
 "Skank" – 3:35
 "Bondage"  – 3:30
 "Vegas Moon" – 3:50
 "Desert Rose" – 4:32
 "Interlude"  – 1:20
 "Crawl" – 4:14
 "Siesta Loca" – 4:00
 "Edification" – 4:03
 "Lull-A-Bye" – 2:34
 "Untitled" – 0:06
 "Untitled" – 0:06
 "Untitled" – 0:06
 "Untitled" – 0:06
 "Scrape" – 3:53
 "Burning Bridges" – 3:50
 "Dose" – 8:18 (instrumental)

References

2006 albums
Ghost Machine albums
Corporate Punishment Records albums